Østlandets Blad is a regional newspaper published in Ski, Norway.

It was established in 1908 under the name Øieren, named after a local lake. It was based in Kråkstad at that time. The name Østlandets Blad was taken in 1919. The political stance was Conservative.

After 1945 it gradually increased from three to five editions a week. As of 2007, the paper has a circulation of 15,343, of whom 15,206 are subscribers. It is owned by Østlandets Blad AS, which is owned 100% by Edda Media.

References

Newspapers established in 1908
Daily newspapers published in Norway
Mass media in Ski, Norway
Conservative Party (Norway) newspapers
1908 establishments in Norway